Lobulia brongersmai, also known as the Brongersma's lobulia, is a species of skink, a lizard in the family Scincidae. The species is endemic to the island of New Guinea.

Habitat

Etymology
The specific name, brongersmai, is in honor of Dutch herpetologist Leo Brongersma.

Description

Reproduction
The mode of reproduction of L. brongersmai is unknown.

References

Further reading
 (1974). "The generic relationships of the scincid lizard genus Leiolopisma and its relatives". Australian Journal of Zoology, Supplementary Series 22 (31): 1–67. (Lobulia brongersmai, new combination).
Zweifel RG (1972). "A new scincid lizard of the genus Leiolopisma from New Guinea". Zoologische Mededelingen 47: 530–539 + Plate I. (Leiolopisma brongersmai, new species).

Lobulia
Endemic fauna of New Guinea
Skinks of New Guinea
Reptiles of Papua New Guinea
Reptiles of Western New Guinea
Reptiles described in 1972
Taxa named by Richard G. Zweifel